WMA Convert is a software created for audio and video files conversion.

Features 
The program supports conversion of MP3, M4A AAC, WAV, WMA audio file formats and MP4, WMV, AVI video formats. Also coverts M4P files to MP3. The option "convert directly to the iPod" is available. 

Software is capable with all most common audio file formats for portable media players. Removes DRM protection legally, because it is capable to bypass restriction using a unique audio and video converting mechanism.

See also
 Comparison of video converters
 Audio compression (data)
 List of audio formats
 List of music software

References

External links
 
 MKV to MP4 Converter

Windows-only software
Audio software
Data compression software
Digital container formats
Video conversion software